Niabor (other names also include Beadah, Naibor, Nyabor, Nyabur, Parang Njabur Laki-Laki) is a curved sword from Borneo, a characteristic weapon of the Sea-Dayaks.

Description 
It has a convex edge and concave back broadening towards the tip so that the center of gravity lies at the point. The edge curves in a faint curve towards the tip. The blade usually has one or more broken hollow sections and no midrib. They are usually not decorated. In some versions, a nose-shaped projection is forged to the blade, which is seated on the cutting edge. This projection serves as a kind of parry and finger guard is called Kundieng. It is typical of these swords. Below the finger guard of the blade is rectangular. This place is called Sangau. Between the finger guard and the hilt is called Temporian. The hilt is made of antler or deer horn, just like the Mandau. The pommel is carved in the traditional way and never decorated with animal hair.

The Niabor is very identical to another Sea Dayak sword called Langgai Tinggang. The name Niabor itself is also not to be mistaken with Parang Nabur.

See also 

 Langgai Tinggang
 Mandau
 Pisau raut

References

Further reading 
 
 
 
 

Blade weapons
Weapons of Indonesia
Weapons of Malaysia